Here is an incomplete list of studio-recorded songs by Mina from 1958 to present, as listed by her official website.



'na sera 'e maggio (1960)
'na voce 'na chitarra (e o poco luna) (1994)
'o cielo c'e manna sti 'ccose (2003)
'o cuntrario 'e l'ammore (2003)
'o ffuoco (1960)
'o sole mio (2003)
20 parole (2005)
29 settembre (1975)
7 e 40 (1975)

A
A banda (1970)
A chi (1983)
A night in Tunisia
A praca (1970)
A volte (pretend that i'm her) (1964)
Acqua azzurra, acqua chiara (1984)
Acqua e sale (1998)
Acquolina (1991)
Adagio (1970)
Addio (1965)
Adoro (1993)
Aggio perduto o suonno (1996)
Agua y sal (2007)
Ahi, mi' amor (Romance de Curro "El Palmo") (1983)
Aiutatemi (1959)
Al cuore non comandi mai (Plus fort que nous) (1971)
Alfie (1971)
Alibi (2006)
All the way (2005)
Allegria (1968)
Allora sì (1983)
Almeno tu nell'universo (1995)
Amante amore (1977)
Amante amore (1978)
Amanti (1991)
Amanti di valore (1973)
Amara terra mia (2001)
Amaro è 'o bene (1996)
Amico (1999)
Amor mio (1971)
Amor mio (1972)
Amore (1994)
Amore baciami (1983)
 (1964)
Amore mio (1972)
Amore, amore, amore mio (1992)
Amorevole (1959)
Amornero (1990)
Anata to watashi (tu ed io) (1961)
Anche tu (1979)
Anche un uomo (1979)
Ancora (1986)
Ancora ancora ancora (1978)
Ancora ancora ancora (1978)
Ancora dolcemente (1976)
Ancora tu (1978)
Ancora un po' (1992)
And my heart cried (1968)
Angel eyes (1964)
Angel eyes (2005)
Angela (1978)
Angeli negri (1989)
Angustia (1966)
Anima nera (1992)
April in paris (2005)
Are you lonesome tonight (1989)
As time goes by (1989)
Attimo per attimo (1969)
Ave maria (2000)
Azzurro (1986)

B
Bachelite (1989)
Balada para mi muerte (1972)
Balla chi balla (bala com bala) (1977)
Ballando ballando (1984)
Ballata d'autunno (balada de otono) (1972)
Bambola gonfiabile (1980)
Banana boat (1984)
Be bop a lula (1958)
Bella senz'anima (1986)
Bellezze in bicicletta (1983)
Bell’animalone (2005)
Besame mucho (1967)
Bigne' (1988)
Billy Jean (1990)
Bird dog (1974)
Black Betty (1989)
Black magic woman (1992)
Blowin' in the wind (2000)
Blue moon (2005)
Body and soul (1993)
Boh! (1996)
Bonne nuit (1979)
Boy (1981)
Brava (1965)
Breve amore (1966)
Briciole di baci (1960)
Brigitte Bardot (1984)
Brivido felino (1998)
Bugiardo e incosciente (1969)
Bum ahi! che colpo di luna (1961)
Buona sera (1984)
Buonanotte buonanotte (1980)
Buonasera dottore (1986)
 (alone) (1959)

C
C'aggio a ffà (1985)
C'è più samba (1968)
C'è un uomo in mezzo al mare (1976)
Cablo (1976)
California (1991)
Caminemos (1966)
Can't help the way i am (1986)
Can't take my eyes off of you (2003)
Can't take my eyes off of you / base stumentale (2003)
Can't take my eyes off of you / spot cut 1 (2003)
Can't take my eyes off of you / spot cut 2 (2003)
 (1970)
Canta ragazzina (1967)
Canterò per te (1989)
Canto (anche se sono stonato) (1991)
Canto de ossanha (1970)
Canto largo (1999)
Canzona appassiunata (2003)
Canzone per te (1969)
Canzoni stonate (1988)
Capirò (i'll be home) (1971)
Capirò (i'll be home) (1971)
Capisco (1980)
Cappuccetto rosso (1964)
Caravel (1974)
Careless whispers (1987)
Carlo detto il mandrillo (1973)
Carmela (2003)
Caro (1968)
Caro qualcuno (1982)
Cartoline (1967)
Caruso (1990)
Celeste (1960)
Cenerentola (1964)
Cercami (1999)
Certe cose si fanno (2002)
Certo su di me (1987)
Champagne twist (1962)
Chattanooga choo-choo (1983)
Che bambola ! (1983)
Che fatica (2002)
Che freddo (1961)
Che lui mi dia (basta um dia) (1977)
Che m'è 'mparato a fà (1983)
Che m'importa del mondo (1994)
Che male fa (1986)
Che meraviglia (1970)
Che nome avrà (1989)
Che novità (1979)
Che t'aggia di' (1998)
Che vale per me (1968)
Che volgarità (1979)
Chega de saudade (1963)
Chi dice non da (1968)
Chi sarà (1961)
Chi sarà (1980)
Chiedimi tutto (1995)
Chihuahua (1962)
Chihuahua (1964)
Chitarra suona più piano (1989)
Chopin cha cha (1962)
Cigarettes and coffee (1992)
Città vuota (1963)
Città vuota (1978)
Città vuota (1978)
Clark kent (1997)
Colori (1980)
Colpa mia (1976)
Com acucar, com afeto (1969)
Com acucar, com afeto (1970)
Come gocce (1999)
Come hai fatto (2001)
Come mi vuoi (1992)
Come sinfonia (1961)
Come stai (1992)
Come te lo devo dire (2006)
Come together (1994)
Come un uomo (comme un homme) (1975)
Comincia tu (1984)
Con il nastro rosa (1993)
Con te sarà diverso (1997)
Con te sarà diverso (1997)
Confidenziale (1960)
Confidenziale (1960)
Contigo en la distancia (1981)
Continuando (1994)
Conversazione (1967)
Copacabana (at the copa) (1995)
Corazón felino (2007)
Core 'ngrato (1996)
Coriandoli (1960)
Cosa manca (1986)
Cosa penso io di te (1972)
Così (1981)
Cowboys (1983)
Crazy (1994)
Credi (1970)
Cry (1968)
Cry me a river (1992)
Cu ‘e mmane (2003)
Cubetti di ghiaccio (1961)
Cuestión de feeling (2007)
Cuore, amore, cuore (1988)

D
Da capo (1977)
Da capo (1977)
Da chi (1962)
Dai dai domani (1970)
Dai dai domani (1969)
Dalai (1988)
Dance! darling dance (1959)
Das kind ist in dem teller (1988)
Datemi della musica (2006)
De qué servirá (1968)
Deborah (1968)
Delta lady (1972)
Devi dirmi di si (1983)
Devo dirti addio (pra dizer adeus) (1976)
Devo tornare a casa mia (1973)
Di già (1975)
Di vista (1995)
Dichiarazione d'amore (1973)
Dieci ragazzi (1975)
Dindi (1963)
Dindi (2005)
Dint'o viento (1999)
Dio, come ti amo! (2001)
Distanze (1974)
Dolce fuoco dell'amore (1998)
Dolly (1998)
Domande (1986)
Domenica sera (1973)
Dominga (1970)
Don't (1974)
Don't take your love away (1979)
Don't take your love away (1979)
Donna donna donna (1995)
Doodlin' (1991)
Dopo il cielo (1985)
Dottore (1996)
Dove sarai (2005)
Due note (1960)
Due note (1964)
Due o forse tre (1974)
Dulcis christe (2000)
D’amore non scrivo più (2002)

E
È inutile (1963)
È inutile (1963)
E l'era tardi (1977)
È l'uomo per me (1964)
E la chiamano estate (1984)
E mi manchi (1999)
È mia (menina) (1972)
È natale (1988)
E penso a te (1972)
E penso a te (1971)
E poi... (1973)
E poi... (1978)
È proprio cosi, son io che canto (hey, mister that's me upon the juke box) (1972)
E sa ve' (1977)
E se domani (1964)
E se domani (1988)
E sono ancora qui (1968)
E tu come stai ? (1986)
E tu, chi sei ? (1981)
E va bene, ti voglio (1981)
È vero (1960)
È vero (1964)
È vero (1964)
E... (1965)
Ebb tide (1966)
Ebb tide (1966)
Ecco il domani (2002)
Ecco tutto qui (1977)
Eccomi (1973)
Eccomi (1967)
Eclisse twist (1962)
El porompompero (1976)
El porompompero (1978)
El reloj (1969)
Eloise (1985)
Emmanuelle (1969)
Emozioni (1975)
Emozioni (1978)
Encadenados (1995)
Eppur mi son scordato di te (1985)
Era de maggio (2003)
Era vivere (1965)
Eravamo in tre (1963)
Ero io, eri tu, era ieri (1970)
Eso es el amor (1984)
Esperame en el cielo (1981)
Estate (1984)
Et puis ca sert à quoi (1974)
Every breath you take (1995)
Everything happens to me (1964)
Everything happens to me (1993)

F
Fa qualcosa (1973)
Fai la tua vita (2006)
Fantasia (1968)
Fate piano (1972)
Fermerò qualcuno (1980)
Fermi (1991)
Fermoposta (1999)
Figlio unico (tre das onze) (1992)
Fiore amaro (1979)
Fiori rosa, fiori di pesco (1975)
Fiume azzurro (1972)
Fiume azzurro (1972)
Flamenco (1991)
Flamingo (1974)
Fly me to the moon (1972)
Folle banderuola (1959)
Fortissimo (1990)
Fosse vero (1994)
Fra mille anni (2005)
Fragile (2005)
Franz (1990)
Fuliggine (1992)
Full moon and empty arms (1966)

G
Galeotto fu il canotto (1999)
Ganimede (1990)
Georgia on my mind (1978)
Già visto (1982)
Gimme a little sign (1984)
Giochi d'ombre (1961)
Giorni (1977)
Giuro di dirti la verità (1983)
Give me a boy (1959)
Glaube ihr nicht (1970)
Gloria (1960)
Gloria (1987)
Gone with the wind (2000)
Good evening friends (1976)
Good-bye (2005)
Grande Amor (2007)
Grande amore (1999)
Grande grande grande (1971)
Grande grande grande (1978)
Grande grande grande (1972)
Grease (1986)
Grigio (1997)
Guapparia (2003)

H
Ha tanti cielo la luna (1999)
Hai vinto tu (2002)
Hey jude (1984)
Ho paura (1960)
Ho scritto col fuoco (1959)
Ho un sassolino nella scarpa (1983)
How deep is your love (1985)

I
I discorsi (1969)
I giardini di marzo (1975)
I giardini di marzo (1978)
I giorni dei falò (1972)
I know (1980)
I left my heart in san francisco (1988)
I migliori anni della nostra vita (1999)
I only have eyes for you (1974)
I problemi del cuore (1969)
I ricordi della sera (1992)
I should care (1967)
I sogni di un semplice (1973)
I want to be free (1990)
I want to be loved (1968)
I won't cry anymore (1968)
I' te vurria vasa'!... (2003)
I'll fly for you (1992)
I'll Never Be Free (1968)
I'll see you in my dreams (2002)
I'm a fool to care (1991)
I'm a fool to want you (1966)
I'm glad there is you (1966)
I'm in the mood for love (1974)
Ieri, ieri (1973)
If i fell (1995)
If you leave me now (1985)
Il cielo (1999)
Il cielo in una stanza (1960)
Il cielo in una stanza (1969)
Il cielo in una stanza (1988)
Il cigno dell'amore (1982) (Note: It was covered by Ajda Pekkan as "Düşünme Hiç" in "Süperstar 3" album in 1983)
Il corvo (1991)
Il disco rotto (1962)
Il genio del bene (1991)
Il leone e la gallina (1994)
Il meccanismo (1999)
Il mio nemico è ieri (1970)
Il nostro caro angelo (1975)
Il palloncino (1962)
Il pazzo (2002)
Il plaid (1989)
Il poeta (1969)
Il poeta che non pensa mai (1973)
Il portiere di notte (1988)
Il posto mio (1994)
Il soldato Giò (1962)
Il tempo (1962)
Il testamento del capitano (1976)
Il vento (1979)
Immagina un concerto (1975)
Impagliatori d'aquile (1994)
Improvvisamente (1962)
In autostrada (1985)
In onda (1994)
In percentuale (2002)
In vista della sera (1990)
Indifferentemente (1996)
Inevitabile (2006)
Inibizioni al vento (1973)
Innocenti evasioni (1975)
Insensatez (1964)
Insieme (1970)
Into the groove (1988)
Intro (1976)
Invitation (1966)
Invoco te (1960)
Io amo tu ami (1961)
Io camminerò (1976)
Io che amo solo te (1969)
Io e te da soli (1971)
Io ho te (1998)
Io innamorata (1968)
Io non volevo (1998)
Io sarò con te (1996)
Io sono il vento (1959)
Io sono quel che sono (1964)
Io ti amavo quando (you've got a friend) (1972)
Io tra di voi (1970)
Io vivrò senza te (1972)
Io vivrò senza te (1971)
Io voglio solo te (1999)
Io vorrei... non vorrei... ma se vuoi (1989)
Io, domani (1986)
It's impossible (1988)
It's only make believe (1974)
It's your move (1982)

J
Je so pazzo (1994)
Je sto vicino a te (1996)
Joana francesa (1993)
Johnny (1997)
Johnny B. Goode (1989)
Johnny Guitar (1967)
Johnny kiss (1959)
Johnny scarpe gialle (2006)
Julia (1959)
Juntos (1972)
Just let me cry (1963)
Just the way you are (1985)

K
Killing me softly with his song (1985)

L
L'abitudine (daddy's dream) (1972)
L'altra metà di me (1986)
L'amore è bestia, l'amore è poeta (1980)
L'amore è un'altra cosa (1974)
L'amore viene e se ne va (2006)
L'amore, forse (ao amigo tom) (1972)
L'aquila (1975)
L'immensità (1967)
L'importante è finire (1975)
L'importante è finire (1978)
L'indifferenza (1991)
L'irriducibile (1993)
L'ultima occasione (1965)
L'ultima preghiera (1959)
L'ultima volta (1976)
L'ultimo gesto di un clown (1988)
L'uomo della sabbia (1970)
La bacchetta magica (1996)
La banda (1967)
La barca (1964)
La canzone del sole (1994)
La canzone di Marinella (1967)
La canzone di Marinella (1997)
La casa del nord (1984)
La casa del serpente (1991)
La compagnia (1988)
La controsamba (1983)
La donna riccia (2001)
La febbre dell'hula hoop (1959)
La fin des vacances (2005)
La fine del mondo (1960)
La follia (1992)
La fretta nel vestito (2005)
La lontananza (2001)
La luna e il cow boy (1959)
La mente torna (1973)
La mia carrozza (1972)
La mia vecchiaia (1973)
La montagna (1989)
La musica è finita (1969)
La nave (1984)
La nonna Magdalena (1960)
La notte (1993)
La notte (1960)
 (1989)
La pioggia di marzo (1973)
La ragazza dell'ombrellone accanto (1963)
La scala buia (1975)
La seconda da sinistra (2002)
La sera che partì mio padre (1977)
La solita storia d'amore (1973)
La tua voce dentro l'anima (1977)
La verità (1959)
La verità (1984)
La vigilia di natale (1973)
La vita goccia a goccia (1973)
La vita vuota (1982)
La voce del silenzio (1968)
Lacreme napulitane (1978)
Lacrime e voce (1999)
Laia ladaia (reza) (1972)
Lamento d'amore (1973)
Lassame (1959)
Laura (2005)
Lazy river (1986)
Le cinque della sera (1960)
Le coeur en larmes (1969)
Le farfalle nella notte (1971)
Le mani sui fianchi (1972)
Le mille bolle blu (1961)
Le tue mani (1962)
Legata ad uno scoglio (1991)
Legittime curiosità (1987)
Les cornichons (big nick) (1989)
Les oiseaux reviennent (1974)
Let it be (1993)
Liebe am sonntag (1974)
Liza (1981)
Llévate ahora (2007)
Lo farei (1990)
Lo faresti (1989)
Lo shampoo (1991)
Lontanissimo (somewhere) (1966)
Love me (1993)
Love me tender (1991)
Love me, please love me (1991)
Lui, lui, lui (1988)
Luna lunera (1987)
Lunarità (1991)
Lunedì 26 ottobre (1968)

M
Ma che bontà (1977)
Ma che freddo fa (1969)
Ma chi è cosa fa? (1990)
Ma chi è quello lì (1987)
Ma ci pensi (1979)
Ma è soltanto amore (1969)
Ma l'amore no (1969)
Ma se ghe penso (1967)
Ma tu ci pensi (1996)
Magia (1983)
Magica follia (1982)
Magnificat (2000)
Mai (1959)
Mai cosi (1966)
Mai prima (1974)
Makin' love (1960)
Malafemmena (1990)
Malatia (1958)
Malatia (2002)
Mandalo giù - l'elisir tirati su (1967)
Mappamondo (1987)
Margherita (1978)
Maria mari'!... (2003)
Marrakesh (1982)
Maruzzella (1996)
medley bussola 72 (1972)
Meglio così (1996)
Memorare (2000)
Mente (2002)
Messaggio d'amore (1998)
Metti uno zero (1995)
Mi fai sentire cosi strana (1971)
Mi guardano (1963)
Mi guardano (1970)
Mi manchi tu (1987)
Mi mandi rose (1985)
Mi piace tanto la gente (1982)
Mi sei scoppiato dentro il cuore (1966)
Mi vendo (1999)
Mi vuoi lasciar (1960)
Michelle (1976)
Miele su miele (1981)
Mille motivi (1993)
Mio di chi (1985)
Misty (1983)
Mogol Battisti (2006)
Moi je te regarde (1969)
Moliendo cafè (1961)
Momento magico (1984)
Mood indigo (1976)
Moody's mood (1988)
Moonlight serenade (1976)
More than words (1995)
Morirò per te (1982)
Mr. Blue (1974)
Munastero 'e santa chiara (1969)
Musica (1980)
 (1982)
Musica per lui (1996)
My cherie amour (1987)
My crazy baby (1959)
My love (1976)
My melancholy baby (1966)
My Sharona (1985)
My true love (1959)
My way (2005)

N
Nada te turbe (2000)
Napule e' (2003)
Nature boy (1983)
Naufragati (1995)
Nè come nè perchè (1968)
Ne la crois pas (1969)
Nei miei occhi (1985)
Nel blu, dipinto di blu (2001)
Nel fondo del mio cuore (1968)
Nem vem que nao tem (1970)
Neri (1999)
Nessun altro mai (2006)
Nessun dolore (1987)
Nessuno (1959)
Nessuno al mondo (1970)
Neve (1992)
Never never never (1977)
Nient'altro che felici (1990)
Niente di niente (1968)
Nieve (2007)
Ninguem me ama (1964)
Ninna nanna (1984)
Ninna nanna amore stanco (1973)
Ninna pà (1993)
No (1966)
No (1981)
No arms can ever hold you (1968)
No juego más (1975)
No lo creas (1972)
No sé si eres tú (2007)
No, non ha fine (1960)
Noi (1994)
Noi due (1967)
Noi due nel mondo e nell'anima (1988)
Noi soli insieme (1997)
Non avere te (1992)
Non c'è che lui (1969)
Non c'è più audio (1995)
Non ci sono emozioni (1990)
Non credere (1969)
Non è Francesca (1975)
Non è niente (1994)
Non gioco più (1975)
Non ho difese (1983)
Non ho parlato mai (1971)
Non illuderti (1964)
Non partir (1958)
Non passa (1999)
Non piangerò (just let me cry) (1964)
Non può morire un'idea (1978)
Non sei felice (1960)
Non si può morire in eterno (1997)
Non so (1974)
Non so dir (ti voglio bene) (1993)
Non ti riconosco più (1972)
Non ti scordar di me (1969)
Non tornare più (1973)
Non tornerò (1979)
Non voglio cioccolata (1960)
Nostalgias (1993)
Notte di luna calante (2001)
Notte di san Valentino (1990)
Notturno delle tre (2002)
Nuages (1993)
Nuda (1976)
Nuie (1960)
Nun è peccato (1996)
Nuur (1974)

O
O sole mio (1969)
Oggi è nero (1982)
Oggi sono io (2002)
Ogni tanto è bello stare soli (1986)
Oh, darling (1989)
Ollallà Gigi (1963)
Om mani peme hum (1993)
Omni die (2000)
Once I loved (2005)
One for my baby (2005)
Only the lonely (2005)
Only you (1983)
Ora o mai più (1965)
Ormai (1977)
Oro (1994)
Oroscopo (1977)
Ossessione 70 (1972)
Oui oui oui (1959)
Oye como va (1992)

P
Parlami d'amore Mariù (1993)
Parole parole (1972)
Parole parole (2007)
Pasqualino marajà (2001)
Passion flower (1959)
Passione (1996)
Pennsylvania 6-5000 (1976)
Penombra (1974)
Penso positivo (1995)
Per avere te (1987)
Per averti qui (1982)
Per di più (1984)
Per poco che sia (2006)
Per ricominciare (1968)
Per te che mi hai chiesto una canzone (1995)
Per una volta tanto (1990)
Perchè no (1994)
Perdoniamoci (1960)
Perfetto non so (1982)
Personalità (1960)
Pesci rossi (1960)
Piangere un po’ (1959)
Piano (1960)
Pianto della madonna (2000)
Più di cosi (1984)
Più di te (1965)
Pomeriggio sonnolento (1986)
Porque tu me acostumbraste (1995)
Portami con te (1967)
Portati via (2005)
Poster (1985)
Prendi una matita (1961)
Pretend that i'm her (1963)
Profumi, balocchi e maritozzi (1999)
Proprio come sei (1987)
Proteggimi (1959)
Puro teatro (1998)

Q
Qualcosa in più (1980)
Quand'ero piccola (1968)
Quando c'incontriamo (1961)
Quando corpus morietur (2000)
Quando finisce una canzone (1992)
Quando l'amore ti tocca (1981)
Quando mi svegliai (1975)
Quando vedrò (1967)
Quanno chiove (1996)
Quanno nascette ninno (2000)
Quasi come musica (a song for you) (1975)
Quatt'ore 'e tiempo (aria chiesa stradella) (1980)
Que maravilha (1970)
Que no que no (1963)
Que nos separemos (1972)
Que serà (1982)
Quella briciola di più (2005)
Questa cosa chiamata amore (1970)
Questione di feeling (1985)
Questo piccolo grande amore (1986)
Questo si, questo no (1973)
Qui presso a te (2000)

R
Racconto (c'est comme l'arc en ciel) (1975)
Radio (1980)
Rapsodie (1964)
Raso (1993)
Reginella (2002)
Regolarmente (1968)
Renato (1962)
Resta cu'mme (2001)
Resta lì (1997)
Ricominciamo (1996)
Ride like the wind (2000)
Ridi pagliaccio (1988)
Rimani qui (1988)
Rino (1977)
Ritratto in bianco e nero (1986)
Robinson (1992)
Rock and roll star (1979)
Roma, nun fa la stupida stasera (1969)
Rose su rose (1984)
Rossetto sul colletto (1960)
Rosso (1994)
Rotola la vita (1994)
Rudy (1972)

S
S'è fatto tardi (1960)
Sabati e domeniche (1967)
Sabato notte (1961)
Sabor a mi (1964)
Sacumdì, sacumdà (1968)
Sapori di civiltà (1982)
Sarà per te (1989)
Saxophone (1977)
Scettico blues (1976)
Sciummo (1961)
Scrivimi (1987)
Se (2005)
Se avessi tempo (1993)
Se c'è una cosa che mi fa impazzire (1967)
Se finisse tutto così (1995)
Se il mio canto sei tu (1979)
Se mi compri un gelato (1964)
Se non ci fossi tu (1966)
Se piangi se ridi (1965)
Se poi (1992)
Se stasera sono qui (1968)
Se telefonando (1966)
Se tornasse caso mai (1967)
Se tu non fossi qui (1966)
Secondo me (1986)
Sei metà (1979)
Sei o non sei (2005)
Semplicemente tua (1986)
Sempre sempre sempre (1998)
Senora malincolia (1977)
Sensazioni (1979)
Sentado à Beira do Caminho (1970)
Sentimental journey (1967)
Sentimentale (1971)
Sentimentale (1971)
Sentimentale (1960)
Senza fiato (1982) (Note: It was covered by Ajda Pekkan as "Son Yolcu" in "Süperstar 3" album in 1983)
Senza umanità (1985)
Serafino campanaro (1960)
Serpenti (1987)
Sfiorisci bel fiore (1977)
Shadow of my old road (1979)
She's leaving home (1980)
Si (1969)
Si che non sei tu (1993)
Si lo so (1962)
Si, l'amore (1993)
Si, viaggiare (1978)
Si, viaggiare (1978)
Signora più che mai (1975)
Silenzioso slow (1969)
Sin Piedad (2007)
Sincerely (1995)
Slowly (1962)
So (1967)
So che mi vuoi (1965)
So che non è così (1964)
Sognando (1976)
Sognando (1978)
Sogno (sonhos) (1984)
Soli (1965)
Solo lui (1974)
Solo un attimo (2002)
Soltanto ieri (1961)
Someday (you want me to want you) (1972)
Someday - you want me to want you (1974)
Someday in my life (1997)
Something (1971)
Somos (1967)
Somos novios (1998)
Sono come tu mi vuoi (1966)
Sono qui per te (1966)
Sono sola sempre (1981)
Sono stanco (1990)
Sophisticated lady (1983)
Sorry seems to be the hardest word (1987)
Sotto il sole dell'avana (1986)
Spara (1985)
Specchi riflessi (1998)
Splish splash (1959)
Squarciagola (1981)
Stai così (1997)
Stardust (1991)
Stars fell on Alabama (1964)
Stasera io qui (1978)
Stay with me (Stay) (1999)
Stayin' alive (1978)
Stella by starlight (1964)
Stessa spiaggia stesso mare (1963)
Stile libero (1993)
Strada 'nfosa (2001)
Stranger boy (1963)
Strangers in the night (1984)
Strangers in the night (2005)
Street angel (1979)
Stringimi forte i polsi (1962)
Succede (1996)
Succhiando l’uva (2002)
Sulamente pè parlà (1995)
Sull'Orient Express (2006)
Summertime (1961)
Suona ancora (1997)
Suoneranno le sei (balada para mi muerte) (1972)
Sweet transvestite (1982)

T
T'ho vista piangere (1959)
T.i.r. (1989)
Ta-ra-ta-ta (1966)
Te voglio bene assaje (2003)
Te vulevo scurdà (1959)
Tem mais samba (1970)
Tentiamo ancora (1973)
Teorema (1993)
Terre lontane (1976)
Tessi tessi (1960)
That old feeling (1967)
That's when your heartaches begin (1974)
The captain of her heart (1995)
The diary (1959)
The end (2006)
The fool on the hill (1993)
The groove merchant (1972)
The long and winding road (1993)
The man i love (1990)
The man that got away (1967)
The nearness of you (1964)
The nearness of you (2005)
The wind cries Mary (2000)
These foolish things (2005)
They can't take that away from me (1995)
This masquerade (1988)
Ti accetto come sei (1975)
Ti accompagnerò (1993)
Ti dimentichi di maria (1982)
Tiger bay (1979)
Timida (1995)
Tintarella di luna (1959)
Tira a campà (1977)
To be loved (1974)
Todas as mulheres do mundo (1970)
Tornerai qui da me (1994)
Torno venerdi (1995)
Tra napoli e un bicchiere (1980)
Tradirò (1977)
Traditore (1991)
Trasparenze (1974)
Tre volte dentro me (1997)
Tre volte si (1989)
Trenodia (1967)
Tres palabras (1981)
Triste (1976)
Tu ca nun chiagne! (2003)
Tu con me (1987)
Tu dimmi che città (1994)
Tu farai (1964)
Tu musica divina (1973)
Tu no (1975)
Tu non credi più (1966)
Tu non mi lascerai (1967)
Tu sarai la mia voce (put the weight on my shoulders) (1981)
Tu sei mio (1961)
Tu senza di me (1959)
Tu si' 'na cosa grande (2001)
Tu vuoi lei (1987)
Tua (1959)
Tutto (1960)
Tutto passerà vedrai (1974)

U
Uappa (1975)
Uh uh (1981)
Un anno d'amore (1964)
Un año de amor (2007)
Un bacio è troppo poco (1965)
Un buco nella sabbia (1964)
Un colpo al cuore (1968)
Un cucchiaino di zucchero nel thè (1986)
Un disco e tu (1959)
Un giorno come un altro (1969)
Un nuovo amico (1992)
Un piccolo raggio di luna (1960)
Un pò d'uva (1973)
Un pò di più (1979)
Un tale (1961)
Un tipo indipendente (1988)
Un uomo che mi ama (2006)
Un'aquila nel cuore (1983)
Un'estate fa (1990)
Un'ombra (1969)
Un'ora (1988)
Un'ora fa (1969)
Una canzone (1981)
Una casa in cima al mondo (1966)
Una donna, una storia (1970)
Una lunga storia d'amore (1989)
Una mezza dozzina di rose (1969)
Una musica va (1974)
Una ragazza in due (1977)
Una zebra a pois (1960)
Und dann (1974)
Uno (1966)
Uomo (1971)
Uomo ferito (1992)
Upa neguinho (1970)
Uscita 29 (1989)
Uvas Maduras (2007)

V
Va bene, va bene cosi (1994)
Vacanze (1971)
Vai e vai e vai (2005)
Valentino vale (1963)
Valsinha (2007)
Vedrai vedrai (1971)
Veni creator spiritus (2000)
Venus (1959)
Venus (1986)
Verde luna (1981)
Via di qua (1984)
Via di qua (1986)
Vincenzina e la fabbrica (1977)
Vita vita (1977)
Viva lei (1970)
Voce 'e notte (1996)
Voglio stare bene (1980)
Voi ch'amate lo criatore (2000)
Vola vola da me (1962)
Volami nel cuore (1996)
Volendo si può (1972)
Voli di risposte (1992)
Vorrei averti nonostante tutto (1972)
Vorrei che fosse amore (1968)
Vorrei sapere perchè (1959)
Vuela por mi vida (2007)
Vulcano (1963)

W
Walk on by (1981)
Wave (1994)
We are the champions (1978)
When (1958)
When i'm 64 (1993)
When you let me go (1995)
When your lover has gone (1989)
Whisky (1959)

Y
Y que? (1975)
Yeeeeh (1990)
Yesterday (1993)
Yesterday (1971)
You are my destiny (1958)
You are my love (1985)
You go to my head (1964)
You keep me hangin'on (1980)
You make me feel brand new (1987)
You'll never never know (1988)
You're mine you (1968)
You're so vain (1985)
You've made me so very happy (1972)
Young at love (1965)

Z
Zio Tom (1990)
Zum zum zum (1968)

¿
¿Cómo estás? (2007)

 
Mina